The Paternoster Gang is an audio play series from Big Finish Productions. Neve McIntosh, Catrin Stewart & Dan Starkey reprise their roles of Madame Vastra, Jenny Flint, and Strax respectively from the television series Doctor Who. It is executive produced by Jason Haigh-Ellery and Nicholas Briggs. Big Finish announced the series, in November 2018, comprising four volumes and produced in association with BBC Studios.

Cast

Episodes

Heritage 1 (2019)

Heritage 2 (2019)

Heritage 3 (2020)

Heritage 4 (2020)

Trespassers 1

Trespassers 2

Trespassers 3

Trespassers 4

References

Audio plays based on Doctor Who
Big Finish Productions
Doctor Who spin-offs